Irma Sally Rochlin (born April 28, 1924) is an American nurse and former politician in the state of Florida. Rochlin was born in New York and moved to Florida 1935. She is a retired nurse. She served in the Florida House of Representatives from 1984 to 1988 for district 98. She is a member of the Democratic Party.

References

Living people
1924 births
Democratic Party members of the Florida House of Representatives
People from Hallandale Beach, Florida
American nurses